Pascal Ondarts (born 1 April 1956, in Méharin) is a former French Basque rugby union player. He played as a prop and as a hooker. He was considered by The Times one of the 10 most frightening French players ever to represent his National Team.

Ondarts played all his career at Biarritz Olympique, from 1976/77 to 1992/93. He was runners-up to the French Championship in 1991/92.

He had 42 caps for France, scoring 1 try, 4 points in aggregate, from a 16-3 win over New Zealand, at 15 November 1986, in Nantes, in a friendly. It should be noticed that he was already 30 years old when he made his debut for his National Team. He participated in 5 editions of the Five Nations Championship, in 1987, 1988, 1989, 1990 and 1991, being a winner in 1987, with a Grand Slam, 1988, ex-aequo with Wales, and 1989. He played at the 1987 Rugby World Cup, where France lost the final to New Zealand by 29-9, but missed the final, and at the 1991 Rugby World Cup, where he had his last game for his National Team, at 19 October 1991, in the 10-19 loss to England, at the quarter-finals, aged 35 years old.

After ending his player career, he opened a restaurant in his hometown of Biarritz.

English prop Jason Leonard said that "Pascal Ondarts was the best, the toughest and hardest prop against I ever played".

External links

Pascal Ondarts at the article The top 10 frightening Frenchmen

1956 births
Living people
French rugby union players
France international rugby union players
Rugby union props
Rugby union hookers
Biarritz Olympique players
Sportspeople from Pyrénées-Atlantiques
People from Lower Navarre